is a railway station operated by Kurobe Gorge Railway in Kurobe, Toyama Prefecture, Japan.

Station overview 
Sasadaira is a seasonal station. For most of the year, Sasadaira Station is closed to passenger traffic and is only served by trains for Kansai Electric Power Company employees. However, the station is sometimes served by trains between the end of April and the beginning of May, when snowfall prevents trains from heading any further towards Keyakidaira Station. The station is equipped with a toilet.

Adjacent stations

References

Railway stations in Japan opened in 1953
Railway stations in Toyama Prefecture